First-seeded Henri Cochet defeated Bill Tilden 3–6, 8–6, 6–3, 6–1 in the final to win the men's singles tennis title at the 1930 French Championships.

Seeds
The seeded players are listed below. Henri Cochet is the champion; others show the round in which they were eliminated.

  Henri Cochet (champion)
  Bill Tilden (finalist)
  Jean Borotra (semifinals)
  Umberto De Morpurgo (semifinals)
  Edgar Moon (quarterfinals)
  Jack Crawford (second round)
  George Rogers Lyttelton (quarterfinals)
  André Merlin (second round)
  Harry Hopman (quarterfinals)
  Emmanuel Du Plaix (fourth round)
  Vladimir Landau (third round)
  Jacques Brugnon (third round)
  Wilbur Coen (fourth round)
  Yoshiro Ota (fourth round)
  Franz Matejka (second round)
  Otto Froitzheim (second round)

Draw

Key
 Q = Qualifier
 WC = Wild card
 LL = Lucky loser
 r = Retired

Finals

Earlier rounds

Section 1

Section 2

Section 3

Section 4

Section 5

Section 6

Section 7

Section 8

References

External links
   on the French Open website

French Championships - Men's Singles
French Championships (tennis) by year – Men's singles